Lake Wenatchee State Airport  is a public use airport located 14 nautical miles (26 km) northwest of the central business district of Leavenworth, a city in Chelan County, Washington, United States. It is owned by the Washington State DOT Aviation Division.

The airport is located next to Lake Wenatchee State Park with 197 well prepared campsites. Outdoor toilets and space for camping are also available on the airport. Fishing, water recreation, and hiking are available at the nearby lakes.

Facilities and aircraft 

The runway surface is somewhat rough and animals are very common. A local winter recreation club does much of the maintenance, and work crews and equipment are common. Trees surround the airport, and there are trees in both approaches close in. The airport is generally open from June 1 to October 1.

For the 12-month period ending May 30, 2012, the airport had 600 general aviation aircraft operations, an average of 50 per month.

References

External links 
 Lake Wenatchee State Airport page at WSDOT Aviation

Airports in Washington (state)
Transportation buildings and structures in Chelan County, Washington